The Korea Society was founded in 1957. The group is a private, non-partisan, non-profit organization formed under 501(c)(3) with a foundation of both corporate and independent members with the core mandate of ensuring understanding, cooperation, and awareness between the United States and Korea. The program receives funding from endowments, contributions, and grants. The Korea Society has its base in New York, where it works on forging alliances and outreach programs favoring progressive relationships between the US and Korea.

The Korea Society is associated with the work of General James Van Fleet, a commander of US forces involved in the final phase of the Korean War. The organization adopted its current name following an amalgamation of several groups in 1993 to form The Korea Society.

History 
In 1953, van Fleet left Korea after leading the UN, US, and South Korean forces as a commander in the US Eighth Army division. The general made inroads with his Korean counterparts and the bonds created through the war formed  a strong desire to further the partnership. At his departure, Van Fleet said, "I shall come back. You have made me a part of you. I know you are a part of me. I shall not ask you to give me back my heart. I leave it with you."

Upon his return to the US, Van Fleet commenced a campaign to raise funds to facilitate reconstruction efforts and aid support for the people of Korea. Following his position during the war, Van Fleet occupied the position of chairman to the American-Korean Foundation (AFK) in the 1950s. Van Fleet was successful in facilitating a fund drive aimed at humanitarian efforts for the Korean people in need of aid. This success led to other aspirations in using his relationships and position to further cooperation between the United States and the people of Korea. In this effort, he sought the input of leaders such as Arthur Hays Sulzberger of The New York Times, Henry Luce of Time-Life, Spyros P. Skouras of 20th Century Fox, William Randolph Jr. Van Fleet also sought the involvement of William Zeckendorf, a real estate developer, Juilliard President, William Schuman, and Ben C. Lim, the first Korean Ambassador to the UN.

The Korea Society set up its first operation center at 420 Lexington Avenue with a vision of a non-sectarian, non-political, and non-profit agenda aimed at strengthening the existing United States and Republic of Korea alliance. The organization received its first boost and acknowledgment from President Eisenhower through a government endorsement. Since its inception in the 1950s, the organization has progressively followed subsequent alignments following bilateral relations between the US and Korea. The vision of Van Fleet is maintained through programs aimed at awarding and honoring Americans and Koreans engaged in outstanding programs and achievements. The award honorees granted over the years include Ban Ki-moon, Jimmy Carter, Chey Tae-won, Park Yong-man, Colin Powell, Chung Mong Koo, Lee Kun-hee, George W. Bush, and Kim Dae-jung.

References

External links
 

501(c)(3) organizations